Thomasville Dragons was a women's soccer team based in Thomasville, Georgia. They played in the Women's Premier Soccer League, the third tier of women's soccer in the United States and Canada from 2008 to 2010.

The team played in the Sunshine Conference. They played their home games at the Singletary Soccer Complex in Thomasville, Georgia. The club's colors were white and burgundy.

Year-by-year

Coaches
  Aly Joslin 2008–2010
  Rick Zambrano 2008–2010

Stadium
 Singletary Soccer Complex, Thomasville, Georgia 2008–2010

References

External links
 Official Site
 WPSL Thomasville Dragons page

Women's Premier Soccer League teams
Women's soccer clubs in the United States
Soccer clubs in Georgia (U.S. state)
2008 establishments in Georgia (U.S. state)
Association football clubs established in 2008
Thomas County, Georgia